Quatloo may refer to:

 Quatloos.com, an internet fraud awareness website
 A currency used in the Star Trek episode "The Gamesters of Triskelion"